The Stylist is a 2020 American horror drama film produced, co-written and directed by Jill Gevargizian. The film is based on the director's short film of the same name and stars Najarra Townsend and Brea Grant. The film premiered at the 2020 Fantastic Fest.

Plot
Claire, a lonely hairdresser based in Kansas City, Missouri, is a murderer who discreetly kills and scalps her clients, storing their scalps in her cellar as a way to cope with feelings of self-loathing. Her friend Olivia asks Claire to do her hair for her upcoming wedding, which Claire agrees to. Claire tries to fit in with Olivia's friends, but is mocked for being socially awkward. After several failed attempts at suppressing her deadly urges, Claire finally gives in and murders Olivia. She then puts on Olivia's scalped hair and dress, and walks down the aisle pretending to be her. When the groom unveils her, he panics and the audience runs away in terror. Claire stays alone in the church crying, because even with Olivia's scalp, she can't get what she wanted.

Cast

Release
The Stylist premiered at Fantastic Fest on September 25, 2020, and was subsequently screened at the Final Girls Berlin Film Festival on February 5, 2021, as well as screening in a Narrative Feature Competition at the Florida Film Festival in April 2021.

The film was released on Arrow, Arrow Films' streaming platform, on March 1, 2021, in the United States, Canada, and the United Kingdom. On June 8, 2021, it was released on Blu-ray, DVD, and video on demand platforms via Arrow Video. The Blu-ray version features a short film titled "The Stylist" (which was director's short film in 2016) and a new short "Pity" and "The Invisible Woman", a visual essay by author and critic Alexandra Heller-Nicholas. It also includes behind-the-scenes footage, outtakes, and location scouting.

Reception
On review aggregator Rotten Tomatoes the film has a score of  based on reviews from  critics, with an average rating of  rating. The website's critics consensus reads, "A slasher with flair and crafty patience for the kill, The Stylist marks writer-director Jill Gevargizian as an uncommonly sharp genre filmmaker."

Starbursts Andrew Pollard called The Stylist "a brilliant movie", while Noel Murray of the Los Angeles Times described the film as a "treat for the eyes, making great use of color, lighting and women's fashions to create a world where attractive surfaces mask something ugly."

Kristy Strouse of Film Inquiry wrote, "The Stylist has everything one can want from a horror film; a talented female lead, lots of chills and bloody enticements, and a wickedly impressive style".

Simon Rother of The Horror News Network wrote, "The Stylist is nonetheless an interesting film that portrays the life of an extreme introvert who has difficulty coping with the social world, all while concealing a disturbing hobby and obsession".

Kat Hughes of The Hollywood News praised the film for its "[i]nherently feminine, gorgeously shot and styled [visuals]", as well as "[its] killer performances, sticky scalping's, and costumes to die for".

According to Meagan Navarro of Bloody Disgusting, "Gevargizian demonstrates a strong, clear vision for her sympathetic psychopath, and The Stylist presents as one of the more sophisticated depictions of a burgeoning serial killer".

Following film's screening at the Final Girls Berlin Film Festival, Erin Grant of the Fear Forever wrote "The Stylist is an incredibly insightful slasher with the right mix of sincerity and comedy".

References

External links
 

2020 films
2020 drama films
2020 horror films
2020 independent films
2020s English-language films
2020s horror drama films
2020s serial killer films
2020s slasher films
American horror drama films
American independent films
American serial killer films
American slasher films
Features based on short films
Fictional hairdressers
Films set in Kansas City, Missouri
Films shot in Missouri
2020s American films